Poole is a census-designated place (CDP) in Buffalo County, Nebraska, United States. It is part of the Kearney, Nebraska Micropolitan Statistical Area. The population of the CDP was 19 at the 2010 census.

History
Poole was founded circa 1889. It was named for rancher W. W. Poole. A post office was established at Poole in 1906, and remained in operation until it was discontinued in 1982.

Geography
Poole is located in northern Buffalo County on the north side of the South Loup River. The nearest incorporated community is Ravenna,  to the northeast.

Demographics

References

Census-designated places in Buffalo County, Nebraska
Unincorporated communities in Nebraska
Kearney Micropolitan Statistical Area